The Ahle Wurst (or Aahle Worscht) is a hard pork sausage made in northern Hesse, Germany. Its name is a dialectal form of alte Wurst – "old sausage".

Depending on the shape it is also called "Stracke" if elongated or "Runde" if round.

Ahle Wurst is a sausage made of pork meat and bacon. Seasoned only with salt and pepper, there are regional differences and some butchers add nutmeg, cloves, pepper, sugar, garlic, cumin and rum or brandy.

In traditional manufacturing only heavy pigs are processed fresh (with the meat still warm) and quality cuts of meat produced. The slow maturation at relatively high humidity is the distinguishing mark of the sausage. The sausage can be smoked or made air-dried.

See also

 List of smoked foods

References

Hessian cuisine
German sausages
Smoked meat